Chingiz Suleimanovich Labazanov (born 18 April 1991 in Bolshaya Martynovka, Russia) is a Chechen-born Russian Greco-Roman wrestler. Senior world champion 2014. He is winner Golden Grand Prix Ivan Poddubny in the Greco-Roman men's 74 kg event and 75 kg 2016, in final match he beat Olympic Champion Roman Vlasov. He is silver medalist in Greco-Roman World Cup (two time) and gold medalist in World Greco-Roman Wrestling Championships 2014. He became Russian National Greco-Roman Wrestling Champion 2015 in 75 kg. He has older brother Ibragim Labazanov Olympic wrestler.

References

External links 
 

1991 births
Chechen people
Living people
Russian male sport wrestlers
Chechen sportsmen
People from Martynovsky District
European Games bronze medalists for Russia
European Games medalists in wrestling
Wrestlers at the 2015 European Games
World Wrestling Championships medalists
Sportspeople from Rostov Oblast